Punchestown Longstone is a menhir (standing stone) and  National Monument near Naas, Ireland.

Location
The Longstone is located about 3.5 km (2 mi) southeast of Naas, and about 600 m north of Punchestown Racecourse, in a field just off the Craddockstown road.

History and archaeology
The nearby Longstone at Forenaghts Great also had a trapezoidal cist which contained cremated human remains, pottery, and a fragment of a wristguard, a typical Beaker find. This suggests the Forenaghts Great Stone was erected in the period 2450–1900 BC when Beaker was in use in Ireland. The Punchestown Longstone probably dates to the same time. In 1981 a Bronze Age cist burial containing the cremated remains of four people were found 700 m (800 yd) east of the Longstone.

The stone (and several others nearby) are mentioned in Gerald of Wales' 1188 Topographia Hibernica:

The stone is made of local granite and is almost 7 metres high, weighing over 9 tonnes. Out of around 600 standing stones in southwestern Ireland, this is the tallest. It fell over in 1931, and was re-erected three years later.

References

Archaeological sites in County Kildare
National Monuments in County Kildare